The Italian School of Pre-Socratic philosophy was in Italy or Magna Graecia in the 6th century BC. The Italian School included such thinkers as Pythagoras, Parmenides of Elea, Zeno of Elea, and Empedocles. Diogenes Laërtius divides pre Socratic philosophy into the Ionian and Italian School.  According to Diogenes Laërtius, the succession goes Pythagoras (“pupil of Pherecydes”), Telauges (his son), Xenophanes, Parmenides, Zeno of Elea, Leucippus, Democritus (“who had many pupils”), Nausiphanes [and Naucydes] (“in particular”), and Epicurus (Succession ends).

Pythagoras traveled from Samos to Croton, beginning the separation from the earlier Ionian schools.  The Pythagoreans established a dualist philosophical school and religious sect concerned with such things as mathematics, music, and medicine; for example Democedes of Croton. The Pythagoreans were attacked at the house of Milo of Croton circa 509 BC, and thereafter fled across the Tarantine Gulf and were found in places such as Metapontum and Tarentum.  

Xenophanes also traveled from Colophon to Magna Graecia. Parmenides founded the Eleatic School, which included as followers Zeno and Melissus of Samos. 

The pluralist and medicine man Empedocles came from Akragas, in present day Sicily, and is best known for originating the cosmogonic theory of the four classical elements.

References

Schools and traditions in presocratic philosophy